La Vía Campesina (from) is an international farmers organization founded in 1993 in Mons, Belgium, formed by 182 organisations in 81 countries, and describing itself as "an international movement which coordinates peasant organizations of small and middle-scale producers, agricultural workers, rural women, and indigenous communities from Asia, Africa, America, and Europe".

La Via Campesina advocates for family-farm-based sustainable agriculture, and was the group that coined the term "food sovereignty". La Vía Campesina carries out campaigns to defend farmer's right to seeds, to stop violence against women, for agrarian reform, and generally for the recognition of the rights of peasants.

History

Background and approach 

Starting in the 1980s governments were intervening less in the rural countryside, which weakened corporate control over peasants' organizations while making a living in agriculture become more difficult. As a result, national peasant groups began to form ties with transnational organizations, starting in Latin America and then on a global scale.

The peasants' rights movement emerged from the new rights advocacy which had arisen in the 1990s; during that time, human rights and development agendas became integrated which expanded from political and civil rights to include social and economic rights. The agrarian peasants' movement moved to challenge the hegemonic ideology of neoliberalism in global economics and to find alternatives that would protect the rights of workers around the world.

Relation to international entities 
The organization was founded in 1993 by farmers organizations from Europe, Latin America, Asia, North America, Central America and Africa. The foundation followed the Uruguay Round of the General Agreement on Tariffs and Trade (GATT), where the World Trade Organization (WTO)'s Agreement on Agriculture and the Trade Related Intellectual Property Rights (TRIPS) were signed and approved. These agreements caused backlash from many people around the world for focusing on technical problems rather than the human right to access to food, especially for those living in the Global South. Globalization was under way at this time, affecting many industries including agriculture. La Vía Campesina gave small farmers a platform to have their voices heard about how these changes were impacting their lives.

The movement has grown and is now recognized as a part of the global dialogue on food and agriculture. It has presented in several international fora, such as:
 The Food and Agriculture Organization of the United Nations (FAO);
 The International Union for the Protection of New Varieties of Plants (UPOV);
 The UN Human Rights Council (HRC);
 The World Intellectual Property Organization (WIPO).

Via Campesina has been involved in the negotiations of the United Nations Declaration on the Rights of Peasants and other people living in Rural areas, adopted by the UN General Assembly in December 2018.

Priorities 
According to La Via Campesina's webpage, the movements main issues are promoting food sovereignty; demanding agrarian reform; people's control over land, water, territories; resisting free-trade; promoting popular peasant feminism; upholding human rights, rights of migrant workers; promoting agroecology; promoting peasant seeds systems; increasing the participation of youth in agriculture.

In recent years, the movement has placed greater emphasis on gender issues and women's rights, and strengthened its opposition to transnational corporations. It has also focused on gaining recognition for the discourse around food sovereignty, reclaiming the term "peasant" and recreating a shared peasant identity across national borders and cultures. La Vía Campesina also partners with other social movements and non-governmental organizations (NGOs) to strengthen its international presence.

Democratic decision-making is central to the mission of La Vía Campesina, and it has been dedicated to fair representation and engagement of all participants, making structural changes when necessary. The perspectives of people around the world are needed to assess and improve global food production and sovereignty. Part of this effort for equality among movement members is creating a shared peasant identity. The reclaiming of this identity has been called "re-peasantization". According to Desmarais (2008), the term "peasant" in English has a connotation related to feudalism, but in other languages and contexts, the meaning is broader; campesino comes from the word campo, meaning "countryside", which ties the people to the land. This feudalist connotation is one reason why the organization chose not to translate its name into English.

Awards 
In November 2018, La Vía Campesina received the XV Navarra International Prize for Solidarity (Premio Internacional Navarra a la Solidaridad).

In June 2018, the autonomous, pluralist and multicultural movement, which is entirely independent from any political or economical affiliation, was awarded the Lush Spring Prize Influence Award

In 2015, the organization received an award from the Latin American Scientific Society for Agroecology (SOCLA) "in recognition of its example of tireless struggle in favor of agroecology and the rights of peasants, in carrying out its mission to take care of the earth, feed the world, conserve biodiversity and cool the planet, through its constant search for food sovereignty in Latin America."

In 2004, La Vía Campesina was awarded the International Human Rights Award by Global Exchange, in San Francisco.

Organization

 La Vía Campesina is a grassroots movement, with activism at the local and national level. Members come from 81 countries, organised into 9 regions. The International Coordinating Committee is represented by one man and one woman per region and one youth per continent, each elected by their respective region's member organisations. With about 182 local and national organisations as part of the movement, La Via Campesina represents an estimated 200 million farmers around the world.

According to Menser (2008), La Via Campesina is an example of the success and expansion of transnational movements in regards to participatory democracy due to its organization model and adaptation to ensure fair representation.

Meetings 
Representatives from each region meet at International Conferences roughly every four years. Past meetings were held in Mons in 1993, Tlaxcala City in 1996, Bangalore in 2000, São Paulo in 2004, Maputo in 2008, Jakarta in 2013, and Derio in 2017. The international secretariat changes its central location every 4 years based on the decision made at the International Conference. Past locations were Belgium (1993-1996), Honduras (1997-2004), Indonesia (2005-2013) and Harare (2013-2021).

Since November 2021, the secretariat has been in Bagnolet, France.  The current General Coordinator is Morgan Ody, a vegetable producer from Bretagne, France, member of (La Confédération paysanne and European Coordination Via Campesina (ECVC).

Women's involvement 
Gender was ignored as a consideration at the start of the movement. At the signing of the Managua Declaration - the precursor to La Vía Campesina - all 8 people present were men. Peasant women started to become more involved and pushing for women's rights at the International Conference in Tlaxcala in 1996. At this meeting, they decided to form a committee dedicated to women's rights and gender issues, which eventually became the Vía Campesina's Women's Commission. The women on the committee were also heavily involved in editing the draft of the cornerstone position on food sovereignty that was presented at the World Food Summit in 1996. They included health as a consideration for food production without agro-chemicals, as well as the importance of women's involvement in policy changes because women typically were barred from political involvement. The women of La Vía Campesina are still working for greater representation and engagement of peasant women, especially in leadership positions.

Food sovereignty
La Vía Campesina introduced the right of food sovereignty at the World Food Summit in 1996 as "the right of peoples to healthy and culturally appropriate food produced through sustainable methods and their right to define their own food and agriculture systems." The phrase "culturally appropriate" signifies that the food that is available and accessible for the population should fit with the cultural background of the people consuming it. For example, subsidised and imported wheat products would not fall under this category in a country where corn-based foods were the basis of traditional meals.

Food sovereignty vs. food security 
Food sovereignty differs from food security. Food security was defined as "physical, social, and economic access to sufficient, safe, and nutritious food... at all times to meet [the population's] dietary and food preferences for an active and healthy life" by D. Moyo at the American Society of International Law annual meeting in 2007. Food security is more focused on the provision of food for all by whatever means necessary, whether by local production or global imports. As a result, economic policies concerned with food security typically emphasize industrial farming that can produce more food cheaper.

Food regimes 
Friedmann defines a food regime as a “rule governed structure of production and consumption of food on a world scale”. A food regime is marked by a period of transition in food production that results in significant social, political, and economic change. The current situation of global food production can be called the "corporate food regime" due to the concentration of supplying and processing food in the private sector. For example, US corporations have control over food production by subcontracting smaller farmers, which allows them to participate and profit without taking on the risks of farming, such as weather and disease. Food regimes are the result of “political struggles among contending social groups” for control over how food production is framed and conceptualized, according to McMichael. The corporate food regime came about with the neoliberal economic theory which is motivated by efficiency and trade liberalization, and states that nations should focus their efforts and resources on producing goods and services where they have an advantage relative to other nations (that is, goods that they are best at producing), as cited by Philip McMichael. The corporate food regime has existed for only the last 100 years, as compared to the millennia prior to industrialization and the Green Revolution.

See also

Further reading
 Food Sovereignty, a Manifesto for the Future of Our Planet | La Via Campesina, "25 years of Collective Struggle for Food Sovereignty", La Via Campesina Website, 2021
 Desmarais, Annette Aurélie (2007): La Vía Campesina: Globalization and the Power of Peasants, Fernwood Publishing, 
 
 Martínez-Torres, María Elena, and Peter M. Rosset, "La Vía Campesina: the birth and evolution of a transnational social movement", Journal of Peasant Studies, 2010

Internal links

External links
 Vía Campesina English-language home page
 We are La Vía Campesina video of presentation
 List of Members
 Declaration of Rights of Peasants - Women and Men
 La Vía Campesina Policy Documents
 International Nyeleni Newsletter, voice of the Food Sovereignty movement, in which Vía Campesina is involved
 Organisational Brochure Edition 2021
 War on Want's Vía Campesina project page
 Vía Campesina: an evolving transnational social movement on the website of the Transnational Institute
 Thousands March in Cancún at La Vía Campesina’s "Global Day of Action for Climate Justice", video report by Democracy Now!

References

International agricultural organizations
Anti-globalization organizations
Economic development organizations
Food sovereignty
Land rights movements
Organisations based in Zimbabwe
Organizations established in 1992
Workers' rights organizations
Agrarian politics
Social movements
Environmental organisations based in Belgium